Bethel A.M.E. Church is a historic African Methodist Episcopal church located at Richmond, Wayne County, Indiana. The congregation was founded in 1836. The church was built in 1854, and enlarged and remodeled in the Romanesque Revival style in 1892–1894.  It is a one-story, cruciform plan, brick building with a -story bell tower.  The church serves as an educational, political, and cultural center for the local African-American community.

It was listed on the National Register of Historic Places in 1975.

References

External links

Black Past.org: Bethel African Methodist Episcopal Church, Richmond, Indiana (1836- )

Historic American Buildings Survey in Indiana
African-American history of Indiana
African Methodist Episcopal churches in Indiana
Churches on the National Register of Historic Places in Indiana
Romanesque Revival architecture in Indiana
1836 establishments in Indiana
Churches completed in 1854
Buildings and structures in Richmond, Indiana
National Register of Historic Places in Wayne County, Indiana
Churches in Wayne County, Indiana